Giuseppe Gentile (born 4 September 1943) is a retired Italian triple jumper, who won a bronze medal at the 1968 Summer Olympics.

Biography
From 1962 to 1972 Gentile took part in 33 international competitions, including the 1968 and 1972 Summer Olympics. He won four international medals and six national titles: in the long jump (1968) and triple jump (1965, 1966, 1968, 1970, 1971). After finishing his sporting career, Gentile turned to acting. He  appeared opposite Maria Callas in Medea by Pier Paolo Pasolini, in the role of Jason.

World records
 Triple jump: 17.10 m ( Mexico City, 16 October 1968)
 Triple jump: 17.22 m ( Mexico City, 17 October 1968)

Achievements

See also
 Italian all-time lists – Triple jump
 FIDAL Hall of Fame
 Triple jump world record progression
 Men's long jump Italian record progression

Notes

References

External links
 
 
 

1943 births
Living people
Italian male long jumpers
Italian male triple jumpers
Athletes (track and field) at the 1968 Summer Olympics
Athletes (track and field) at the 1972 Summer Olympics
Olympic athletes of Italy
Olympic bronze medalists for Italy
Athletes from Rome
World record setters in athletics (track and field)
Athletics competitors of Fiamme Oro
Medalists at the 1968 Summer Olympics
Olympic bronze medalists in athletics (track and field)
Mediterranean Games silver medalists for Italy
Athletes (track and field) at the 1963 Mediterranean Games
Athletes (track and field) at the 1967 Mediterranean Games
Universiade medalists in athletics (track and field)
Mediterranean Games medalists in athletics
Universiade bronze medalists for Italy
Medalists at the 1967 Summer Universiade